Events from the year 1840 in Canada.

Incumbents
Monarch: Victoria

Federal government
Parliament of Lower Canada: 15th

Governors
Governor of the Canadas: Robert Milnes
Governor of New Brunswick: George Stracey Smyth
Governor of Nova Scotia: John Coape Sherbrooke
Commodore-Governor of Newfoundland: Richard Goodwin Keats
Governor of Prince Edward Island: Charles Douglass Smith

Events
May 6 — Postage stamps come into use.
June 10 — Queen Victoria and Prince Albert are shot at.
June 28 — Queen Victoria is crowned.
July 23 — Act of Union. The Queen sanctions the union of Upper and Lower Canada. The United Canada Act allows larger government to borrow more money.

Births
January 1 — John Christian Schultz, politician and Lieutenant-Governor of Manitoba (died 1896)
March 24 — Laurent-Olivier David, journalist, lawyer, and politician (died 1926)
September 26 — Louis-Olivier Taillon, politician and Premier of Quebec (died 1923)

October 15 — Honoré Mercier, lawyer, journalist, politician and Premier of Quebec (died 1894)
November 6 — James Fisher, politician (died 1927)
November 9 — Joseph-Adolphe Chapleau, lawyer, politician and 5th Premier of Quebec (died 1898)

Full date unknown
 Patrick J. Whelan, tailor and alleged Fenian sympathizer executed following the 1868 assassination of Canadian journalist and politician Thomas D'Arcy McGee (died 1869)

Deaths
February 21 — Andrew Stuart, lawyer, politician, office holder, and author (born 1785)
April 19 — Jean-Jacques Lartigue, bishop of Montreal (born 1777)

References 

 
Years of the 19th century in Canada
Canada
1840 in North America